John Rice may refer to:

Politicians
 John Rice (fl.1601), Member of Parliament (MP) for Wootton Bassett
 John A. Rice (politician) (1832–1906), politician from Wisconsin
 John B. Rice (1832–1893), U.S. Representative from Ohio
 John Blake Rice (1809–1874), mayor of Chicago, Illinois, 1865–1869, and later a U.S. Representative
 John Campbell Rice (1864-1937), associate justice of the Idaho Supreme Court
 John H. Rice (1816–1911), U.S. Representative from Maine
 John McConnell Rice (1831–1895), United States Representative for Kentucky
 John S. Rice (1899–1985), politician from Pennsylvania
 John T. Rice (1839–1925), politician from Wisconsin
 John Joe Rice (died 1970), Irish Sinn Féin politician
 John Rice (alderman) (c. 1968–2015), Chicago alderman
 John Rice (deputy), member of House of Commons of the North Carolina General Assembly of 1777 for Wake County

Actors
 John Rice, actor for the  King's Men playing company, 1607–25
 Jack Rice (1893–1968), American actor
 John C. Rice (1857–1915), Broadway stage actor

Sports
 John Rice (umpire) (1918–2011), American League umpire, 1955–1973
 John Rice (cricketer) (born 1949), English cricketer, played for Hampshire County Cricket Club
 John H. Rice (American football), American football coach, college administrator, and professor
 John Rice (umpire), American umpire in Major League Baseball

Others
 John Andrew Rice (1888–1968), founder of the Black Mountain College
 John A. Rice (musicologist) (born 1956), American musicologist and Mozart scholar
 John G. Rice, former vice chairman of General Electric, and former president and CEO of GE Infrastructure
 John M. Rice (chess composer) (born 1937), former president of Permanent Commission of the FIDE for Chess Compositions
 John R. Rice (pastor) (1895–1980),  Baptist evangelist and pastor, founder of The Sword of the Lord
 John R. Rice (computer scientist) (born 1934), computer scientist and mathematician
 John R. Rice, inventor of the Angel paintball gun
 John Raymond Rice (1914–1950), U.S. Army soldier killed in South Korea, known for the circumstances surrounding his burial
 John Rice (1951–2005), one of the identical twin dwarf Rice brothers
 John Rice (banker) (c. 1832–?), president of Georgia National Bank in late 1860s
 John Rice (director), screenwriter and director of The Happy Elf